Lancashire is a county in England.

Lancashire may also refer to:

Places
Lancashire, Delaware, an unincorporated community in the United States
Lancashire Road, downhill street in Hong Kong
Lancashire (UK Parliament constituency), a former constituency
West Lancashire, a local government district of Lancashire, United Kingdom

Sport
Lancashire (North), a former regional English rugby union league
Lancashire Aero Club, the oldest established flying school in the United Kingdom
Lancashire Amateur League, an English association football league
Lancashire Combination, a former English football league
Lancashire County Cricket Club, a major English county club
Lancashire League, the name of three different sport leagues - cricket, rugby or football
Lancashire Oaks, a horse race held at Haydock Park Racecourse, Merseyside, England
Lancashire wrestling, an historic wrestling style from Lancashire in England
Lancashire Wolverines, a British 'American football' team based in Blackburn, England

People
Lancashire (surname)

Other uses
Lancashire cheese, a traditional cheese produced in Lancashire, England
Lancashire College, an adult education college in Chorley, Lancashire, England
Lancashire Steel Corporation, a former UK steel producer

See also
Lancashire Steel F.C., a Zimbabwean football club based in Kwekwe
Lanarkshire, a county in Scotland